is a two-year private women's junior college in Aomori, Aomori Prefecture, Japan. The university was established in 1963, and is descended from an art school established in 1937. The school is affiliated with the Roman Catholic Church and was established by members of the Canadian Congregation of Sisters of the Assumption of the Blessed Virgin.

Prominent students include Mari Motohashi, an Olympic curler.

External links 
 Aomori Akenohoshi Junior College
Aomori Akenohoshi Junior College

Japanese junior colleges
Universities and colleges in Aomori Prefecture
Educational institutions established in 1937
Private universities and colleges in Japan
Women's universities and colleges in Japan
Catholic universities and colleges in Japan
Aomori (city)
1937 establishments in Japan